Martin's Cove is a historic site in Wyoming. The 933 acre (3.8 km²) cove is located 55 miles (89 km) southwest of Casper, Wyoming, in Natrona County. It is located on the Mormon Trail and is also part of the North Platte-Sweetwater segment of the Oregon Trail. The Cove was listed in the National Register of Historic Places on March 8, 1977.

History
Before the cross-country railroad was operational, about 70,000 Mormons traveled the Mormon Trail with almost 6,000 dying along the way. In November 1856, about 600 members of the Church of Jesus Christ of Latter-day Saints (LDS Church) emigrating in the Martin Handcart Company were halted for five days in the Cove by snow and cold while on their way to Salt Lake City. The Martin Handcart company had begun its journey on July 28, 1856 which was dangerously late in the season and would ultimately lead to the disaster. Although the number who died in the Cove is unknown, more than 145 members of the Martin Company died before reaching Salt Lake City. A few days prior to their arrival at Martin's Cove, the company was met by a small rescue party with food, supplies, and wagons that Brigham Young, the church president, had sent from Salt Lake City, Utah. On November 4 the company and rescuers forded the bitterly cold Sweetwater River and sought shelter in the cove. That evening a powerful north wind blew the tents to the ground. The tents were set up again, but a blizzard brought heavy snow. The company remained in the camp for five days, unable to proceed due to the snow and cold. A number of the company's cattle died there and were preserved in a frozen state. When the weather warmed, on November 9, the company was able to move on toward Utah. With assistance from the original rescue party and from additional rescue parties that met them along the way, the survivors finally reached Salt Lake City on November 30.

Later many other emigrants would pass by the Cove on their way to Utah, California and Oregon along with Pony Express Riders. During the 1870s, Tom Sun, a French-Canadian frontiersman, purchased the area around the Cove and established Sun Ranch.

Ownership

Following the LDS Church's purchase of nearby Sun Ranch in the 1990s it tried to purchase the Martin's Cove property; to operate it as a historic site. In 2002, a congressional bill for the sale of the property passed the House, but then stalled in the Senate, due to worries about the sale of public land to a religious group. The concerns were mainly the result of the land including areas commonly used as campgrounds by emigrant trains, the Pony Express, and other landmarks such as Devil's Gate. As a result, the Bureau of Land Management (BLM), part of the Interior Department, had to negotiate a long-term lease with the church. This lease was signed in 2004, and allowed the church to manage and maintain the property for 25 years.

In 2006, a settlement following a lawsuit by the American Civil Liberties Union, modified the way the site is administered, and required that the BLM remove religious references from the site and that the church provide a public entrance to the cove through their property, but independent of the Visitors' Center. The church's volunteers at the site were also required to simply answer questions rather than approach visitors with anything that could be interpreted as proselytizing.

Visitors
About 100,000 people visit the site each year, with the majority being LDS Church members. Every year thousands of the church's youth participate in "Handcart Treks" through the area near Martin's Cove. These Treks involve dressing up in period clothing while spending several days pulling handcarts and camping out along the Mormon Trail. The highlight of their Trek is visiting Martin's Cove and nearby Devil's Gate, along with the LDS Visitors' Center.

See also

 Mormon handcart pioneers
 List of Registered Historic Places in Wyoming

References

External links

 Devil's Gate- Mormon Handcart Visitor Center
 Martin’s Cove: Mormon Trail Site
 The Martin's Cove Controversy

Pre-statehood history of Wyoming
Mormon migration to Utah
Oregon Trail
Landmarks in Wyoming
Natural features on the National Register of Historic Places in Wyoming
Mormon Trail
Protected areas of Natrona County, Wyoming
Tourist attractions in Natrona County, Wyoming
Bureau of Land Management areas in Wyoming
Latter Day Saint movement in Wyoming
National Register of Historic Places in Natrona County, Wyoming
Transportation on the National Register of Historic Places in Wyoming